The Honor of the Force is a 1914 American silent comedy film featuring Oliver Hardy and Raymond McKee.

Plot
A crooked policeman joins Big Tucker's gang of grafters and helps to break into his own captain's house to steal an incriminating paper. The captain interrupts them at work and is stunned in the fight, but a ruse planned meticulously by him results in the thieves being captured.

Cast
 C.W. Ritchie as Officer Bradley
 Royal Byron as Nora Malone (as Roy Byron)
 Raymond McKee as Gyp, the Dip
 Oliver Hardy as Fattie (as Babe Hardy)

See also
 List of American films of 1914
 Oliver Hardy filmography

External links

1914 films
1914 short films
American silent short films
American black-and-white films
1914 comedy films
Films directed by Frank Griffin
Silent American comedy films
American comedy short films
1910s American films